The Waingawa River is a river of the Greater Wellington Region of New Zealand's North Island and a major tributary of the Ruamahanga River.

The name Waingawa used to be Waiāwangawanga, wai meaning water and wangawanga meaning uncertain or troubled. By legend the river was named by Haunui-a-nanaia who also named many other parts of the Wairarapa. The river's name is eventually supposed to be corrected as part of a treaty settlement process with Rangitane and Kahungunu but as of 2021 the river's official name remains Waingawa.

Its origins are close to Pukeamoamo / Mitre, the highest peak of the Tararua Range. Once out of the ranges it flows in a straight line southeast across the Wairarapa Valley to join the Ruamahanga River at Te Whiti by Wardell's Bridge.

The Waingawa River is the southwestern boundary of the town of Masterton.

Masterton's water is piped from the Waingawa through a Masterton District Council treatment plant on the river about 10 kilometres west of the town.

See also
List of rivers of New Zealand

References

 

Rivers of the Wellington Region
Rivers of New Zealand